= Assyrian Progressive Nationalist Party =

The Assyrian Progressive Nationalist Party is an Assyrian political party with the goal to revive the Assyrian nation in Iraq, for the Assyrian people. It was founded by Ashur Bit-Shlimon in 1990. The party was based in Baghdad and supported the government of Saddam Hussein. The party opposed Kurdish territorial autonomy.
